John Porter (born 15 August 1950) is an English-born musician, composer and songwriter, living in Poland since 1976.

Originally from Lichfield, after studying political science in Sussex and spending time in Berlin, Porter moved to Poland in the mid-1970s.

He used to perform with his ex-life partner Anita Lipnicka. In 2006, their daughter Pola was born.

Discography

Albums

Live albums

Compilation albums

Collaborative albums

References

External links

Official Site

1950 births
Living people
English emigrants to Poland
Mystic Production artists